The Mullsjö Pentecostal Church is a church building in Mullsjö, Sweden belonging to the Swedish Pentecostal Movement. The current building was opened in 1964 and rebuilt to its current look in 1984.

References

External links

Mullsjö-Nyhem Pentecostal Congregation 

20th-century Pentecostal church buildings
Churches in Mullsjö Municipality
Mullsjö
Pentecostal churches in Sweden
Churches completed in 1964